This is a list of buildings in Sydney completed in the Inter-War Art Deco, Streamline Moderne and Functionalist styles that are historically significant.

Apartment and residential buildings

 Adereham Hall, 71 Elizabeth Bay Road, Elizabeth Bay
 Belgenny, 389 Bourke Street, Surry Hills
 Billyard House, 21b Billyard Avenue, Elizabeth Bay
 Birtley Towers, 8 Birtley Place, Elizabeth Bay
 Cahors, 117Macleay Street, Potts Point
 Caversham Court, 23 Billyard Avenue, Elizabeth Bay
 Chatsbury, 6 Ithaca Road, Elizabeth Bay
 Cherwood, 3 Barncleuth Square, Elizabeth Bay
 Claridge, 28-30 Flinders Street, Darlinghurst
 Edgewater, 6 Billyard Avenue, Elizabeth Bay
 Eltham, 18 Onslow Avenue, Elizabeth Bay
 Franconia (Sydney, Australia), Macleay Street, Potts Point
 Gowrie Gate, 115 Macleay Street, Potts Point
 Huntingdon, 8 Onslow Avenue, Elizabeth Bay
 Kanimbla Hall, 19-19a Tusculum Street, Potts Point
 Macleay Regis, 12 Macleay Street, Potts Point
 Mahratta, Wahroonga
 Marlborough Hall, 4 Ward Avenue, Elizabeth Bay
 Melrose, 23A Billyard Avenue, Elizabeth Bay
 Mont Clair, 347 Liverpool Street, Darlinghurst
 The Oxley, 12 Ward Avenue, Elizabeth Bay
 Park View, 7 St Neot Avenue, Potts Point
 Pembroke Hall, Onslow Place, Elizabeth Bay
 Royal Court, 227 Crown Street, Darlinghurst
 The Rutland, 381 Liverpool Street, Darlinghurst
 Somerset, 23 Billyard Avenue, Elizabeth Bay
 Tahoe, 67 Roslyn Street, Elizabeth Bay
 Tara, 3 Greenknowe Avenue, Elizabeth Bay
 Trent Bridge, 17 St Neot Avenue, Potts Point
 Werrington, 85 Macleay Street, Potts Point
 Winston, 2a Ithaca Road, Elizabeth Bay
 The Wroxton, 22 Roslyn Gardens, Elizabeth Bay
 Wychbury, 5 Manning Street, Potts Point
 3 Onslow Place, Elizabeth Bay
 7 Greenknowe Avenue, Elizabeth Bay
 17 Wylde Street, Potts Point
 17 Elizabeth Bay Road, Elizabeth Bay
 20 Macleay Street, Potts Point

Cinemas and theatres

 Crest Cinema, Blaxcell Street, Granville
 Enmore Theatre, 118-132 Enmore Road, Newtown
 Hayden Orpheum, Military Road, Cremorne
 Minerva Theatre, Orwell Street, Potts Point
 Niterider Theatre Restaurant, 55-57 Parramatta Road, Homebush
 Paris Theatre (demolished), Liverpool Street, Sydney
 Ritz Cinema, 45 St Pauls Street, Randwick
 State Theatre Building, Market Street, Sydney
 United Cinemas, Collaroy Beach, 1097 Pittwater Road, Collaroy
 Valhalla Cinema, (old Astor), Glebe

Cultural buildings
 Museum of Contemporary Art, Circular Quay, Sydney
 North Sydney Olympic Pool, Milsons Point

Hotels and pubs
 Albury Hotel, Oxford St & Barcom Ave, Darlinghurst
 Australian Hotel, Broadway & Abercrombie St Chippendale
 Blue's Point Hotel, Blue's Point Rd & French St McMahon's Point
 Botany View Hotel, King & Darley Sts Newtown
 Bridge Hotel, Victoria Rd & Wellington St Rozelle
 Canterbury Hotel, Canterbury Rd & Tincombe St Canterbury
 Charing Cross Hotel, Carrington Rd & Victoria St, Waverley
 Century Hotel (former), George & Liverpool Sts Sydney
 Civic Hotel, Pitt & Goulburn Sts Sydney
 County Clare Hotel, Broadway & Kensington St Chippendale
 Criterion Hotel, Park & Pitt Sts Sydney
 Golden Sheaf Hotel, 429 New South Head Rd Double Bay
 Erskineville Hotel, Erskineville Rd & Septimus St Erskineville
 Golden Barley Hotel, Edgeware Rd & Llewellyn St Enmore
 Grose Farm Hotel (now the Alfred Hotel), Missenden Rd & Dunblane St Camperdown
 Imperial Hotel, Erskineville Rd & Union St Erskineville
 Henson Park Hotel, Illawarra Rd & Chapel St Marrickville
 Horse & Jockey Hotel, Parramatta Rd & Knight St Hombush
 Hotel Broadway, Broadway & Shepherd St Chippendale
 Hotel Hollywood, Hunt & Foster Sts Surry Hills
 Hunter's Hill Hotel, Gladesville Rd & Joubert St Hunter's Hill
 Hurstville Hotel, Forest Rd & McMahon St Hurstville
 Kauri Foreshore Hotel, Pyrmont Bridge Rd & Bellevue St Glebe
 Kirribilli Hotel, Broughton St & Crescent Ln Kirribilli
 Kurrajong Hotel, Swanson & Park Sts Erskineville
 Light Brigade Hotel, Oxford St & Jersey Rd Paddington
 Marlborough Hotel, King St & Missenden Rd Newtown
 Marrickville Hotel, Marrickville & Illawarra Rds Marrickville
 North Annandale Hotel, 105 Johnson Street, Annandale
 Petersham Inn, Parramatta Rd & Phillip St Petersham
 Pier Hotel, Botany Rd & Excell St Banksmeadow
 Pymble Hotel, 1134 Pacific Hwy Pymble
 Robin Hood Hotel, 203 Bronte Rd Waverley
 Rose, Shamrock & Thistle Hotel, 27 Oxford St Paddington
 Rosebery Hotel, Botany & Epsom Rds Rosebery
 Rozelle Hotel, 118 Victoria Rd Rozelle
 Royal Hotel, Railway Pde & Jubilee St Carlton
 Royal Hotel, 484 Princes Hwy Rockdale
 Royal Oak Hotel, 50 Railway St Lidcombe
 Royal Sheaf Hotel, Hume Hwy & Burwood Rd Burwood
 Tea Gardens Hotel, 2-4 Bronte Rd Bondi Junction
 Tennyson Hotel, Botany Rd & High St Mascot
 The Lakes Hotel, Gardeners Rd & Macquarie St Rosebery
 Unicorn Hotel, Oxford & Hopewell Sts Paddington
 Union Hotel, King & Union Sts Newtown
 Union Hotel, Pacific Hwy & West St North Sydney
 United Australia Hotel (now Sydney Park Hotel), King & Lord Sts St Peters
 Vauxhall Inn, Parramatta Rd & Woodville Rd Granville
 Westminster Hotel, Broadway & Regent St Chippendale

Institutional buildings and facilities
 Concord Repatriation Hospital, Concord
 Dental Hospital of Sydney, Elizabeth Street, Surry Hills
 King George V Memorial Hospital, Missenden Road, Camperdown
 St Margaret's Hospital, Bourke Street, Surry Hills

Office buildings
 AMA House, Sydney, Macquarie Street, Sydney
 Asbestos House, York Street, Sydney
 Australian Catholic Insurance Building, York Street, Sydney
 Amalgamated Wireless Australia (AWA) Building, York Street, Sydney
 Berlei House, Regent Street, Chippendale
 Challis House, Martin Place, Sydney
 City Mutual Life Assurance Building, Hunter Street, Sydney
 Commonwealth Bank Building, Roseville, Sydney
 Commonwealth Trading Bank Building, Martin Place, Sydney
 Grace Building, York Street, Sydney
 Kyle House, Macquarie Place, Sydney
 Mutual Life & Citizens Building, Martin Place, Sydney
 Overseas Union Bank Building, Martin Place, Sydney
 Rural Bank Building (1936–1983), Martin Place Sydney
 Sydney Water Head Office, Bathurst Street, Sydney; under redevelopment as part of the Greenland Centre Sydney
 Transport House, York Street, Sydney
 Wynyard House, York Street, Sydney

Public buildings and facilities

 ANZAC War Memorial, Hyde Park, Sydney
 Archibald Fountain, Hyde Park, Sydney
 Erskineville Town Hall
 King George VI Memorial, Hyde Park, Sydney
 Petersham Town Hall
 Rockdale Town Hall
 St Peters Town Hall

Religious buildings
 Holy Cross Church, Woollahra
 Sydney Chevra Kadisha, Oxford Street, Woollahra

References

External links
Art Deco World

Sydney
Buildings and structures in Sydney
Art Deco